Mastigodiaptomus montezumae is a species of calanoid copepod in the family Diaptomidae. It is found in Central America.

References

Diaptomidae
Articles created by Qbugbot
Crustaceans described in 1955